Bumpass Mountain is a mountain located south of Lassen Peak in Lassen Volcanic National Park, California. It rises to an elevation of  near Bumpass Hell and Lake Helen.
The mountain receives heavy snowfall during the winter, which can lead to deep snowpacks of over 300 inches (7.6 m) near the mountain.

Both the mountain and Bumpass Hell were named in honor of Kendall V. Bumpass, a hunter, guide and prospector in the area around Red Bluff, California, before 1870.

References 

Lassen Volcanic National Park
Mountains of Shasta County, California
Mountains of Northern California